Governor Kirke may refer to:

David Kirke ( 1597–1654), Governor of Newfoundland from 1638 to 1651
Percy Kirke ( 1646–1691), Governor of Tangier from 1681 to 1683